Daescher Building, also known as Kleiderer Brothers, was a historic commercial building located in downtown Evansville, Indiana.  It was built in 1886. It was demolished in September, 1995

It was listed on the National Register of Historic Places in 1982 and delisted in 1995.

References

Former National Register of Historic Places in Indiana
Commercial buildings on the National Register of Historic Places in Indiana
Commercial buildings completed in 1886
Buildings and structures in Evansville, Indiana
National Register of Historic Places in Evansville, Indiana
Buildings and structures demolished in 1995
Demolished buildings and structures in Indiana